Early Dawg is the debut solo studio album by American mandolinist David Grisman. With Del McCoury on guitar and vocals, Jerry McCoury on bass, Bill Keith on banjo plus other well-known musicians, Grisman offers a mix of traditional songs, compositions by Bill Monroe and his own contributions, mainly of bluegrass and progressive bluegrass style.

Track listing
All tracks composed by David Grisman except where indicated
 "Fanny Hill" 
 "Sugar Hill Ramble" 
 "Little Maggie" (Traditional)
 "Blue Grass Twist" (Bill Monroe)
 "Shenandoah Breakdown" (Bill Monroe)
 "Opus 57" 
 "The Prisoner's Song" (Guy Massey)
 "John Henry" (Traditional)
 "Rawhide" (Bill Monroe)
 "Little Sadie" (Traditional)
 "Dark Hollow" (Bill Browning)
 "Dear Old Dixie" (Lester Flatt, Earl Scruggs)
 "Opus 38" 
 "I Wonder Where You Are Tonight" (Johnny Bond)
 "Caravan" (Duke Ellington)
 "Black Mountain Rag" (Traditional)

Personnel
 David Grisman – mandolin, baritone vocal (14)
 Del McCoury – guitar, vocals
 Artie Rose – guitar (2, 6, 10, 13, 15)
 Bill Keith – banjo (2, 6, 10, 15)
 Winnie Winston – banjo
 Frank Wakefield – mandolin (16)
 Jerry McCoury – bass

References

David Grisman live albums
1964 live albums
Sugar Hill Records live albums
Albums produced by David Grisman